Number 111 (Hungarian: A 111-es) is a 1919 Hungarian silent thriller film directed by Alexander Korda and starring Gábor Rajnay, María Corda and Gyula Bartos. The film was based on a novel by Jenő Heltai. It was Korda's final Hungarian film before he went into exile in Austria during the White Terror. The film was remade in 1938.

Plot summary

Cast
 Gábor Rajnay as Ivashiro
 María Corda as Olga / Vera
 Gyula Bartos as Sidney Balbrock
 Lila Gacs as Mabel
 Jenő Törzs as Baron Vásárhelyi
 Dezső Kertész as báró Vásárhelyi György
 Balassa Jenő
 Bäby Becker
 Sándor Dániel

Notes

Bibliography

External links
 

Hungarian silent feature films
Hungarian thriller films
1910s Hungarian-language films
Films directed by Alexander Korda
Films based on Hungarian novels
Films produced by Alexander Korda
Hungarian black-and-white films
1910s thriller films
Silent thriller films